Nirupama Mankad (née Vasant; born 17 January 1947) is a former Indian tennis player. She is the first Indian woman in the modern era to play at a main draw of a Grand Slam.

Nirupama Mankad is the daughter of G. Vasant, a leading tennis player in India in his time. She survives her husband, the late Ashok Mankad, a former Indian Test cricketer. Their son Harsh Mankad is an Indian Davis Cup player.

Mankad won the Asian women's tennis championship in 1965 at the age of 17. She played Wimbledon junior event in 1965 and partnered Anand Amritraj in the mixed doubles event in 1971, reaching the second round. She was India's top ranked tennis player between 1965 and 1978, winning the national championship seven times during this time. She won the Indian government's Arjuna award in 1980.

Her best ranking was No 1, and was also a two-time Asian champion and a Fed Cup player.

Career finals

Singles (9–7)

Doubles (11–8)

References

External links
 K. R. Wadhwaney, Arjuna Awardees, Publications Division, Ministry of Information and Broadcasting, Government of India, 2002, 
 P.K. Datta, A Century of Indian Tennis, Publications Division, Ministry of Information and Broadcasting, Government of India, 2001, 

1947 births
Living people
Indian female tennis players
Recipients of the Arjuna Award
Racket sportspeople from Karachi
Pakistani female tennis players
20th-century Indian women
20th-century Indian people